Sornzig-Ablaß is a former municipality in the district Nordsachsen, in Saxony, Germany. It was established in 1994 by the merger of the former municipalities Sornzig and Ablaß. On 1 January 2011, it was absorbed into the town Mügeln. Its 19 Ortsteile became Ortsteile of Mügeln.

References 

Former municipalities in Saxony
Nordsachsen